The Iveco T-series is a medium to heavy-duty truck model produced by the Italian manufacturer Iveco, although it used the squared-off H-series cab originally introduced by Fiat in 1970. The truck was badged as an Iveco Fiat from 1975 and by 1980 the "Fiat" portion had been dropped entirely. A lighter duty range called the M-series was added in mid-1984, replacing the long defunct Fiat 130NC.

Development

It was originally sold with either Fiat or OM badging, with a number indicating the gross tonnage (170-190). The cab was the same as had been used on the Fiat 619N1, introduced in 1970, with some differences at the front. Lighter-duty versions were also offered, such as the 110 and 135. Aside from Fiat and Iveco badges, UNIC and Magirus badges were also used to aid sales in markets where those badges had more resonance.

As turbodiesels were introduced, models thus equipped became known as the Iveco Turbo.

Middle-weight models
In 1984 the medium-range models received a new cab. The new version was more aerodynamic, with some new panels up front. The grille, bumpers, wings, steps, and some other details were now plastic. The redesigned doorhandles were mounted flush in the doors. The 135.14 and the 135.17 were set apart by the installation of a turbocharger. Iveco's 5.5-liter 8060 inline-six engine thus offered either . Smaller trucks, up to the 145, had their headlights mounted in the grille, while larger models had them in the bumper (165 and up).

The middle range Iveco 159 and 180 arrived in 1986, replacing the existing Fiat 160 range. In 1987, the Deutz-engined (air-cooled).

Latin America
This model was built as the Iveco 150 in Argentina from 1986 until 1997. There were also heavier duty 190-series models, as well as the more powerful 190.33. The 150 had a turbocharged 5.8-liter inline-six diesel engine.

Gallery

References

T-series
Cab over vehicles
Vehicles introduced in 1975